"He Liked to Feel It" is a song by Canadian rock band Crash Test Dummies, released as the second track on their third studio album, A Worm's Life (1996). The song was written by the band's lead singer, Brad Roberts, and was produced by Brad alongside his brother and bassist Dan Roberts alongside drummer Michel "Mitch" Dorge. Arista Records released it as the lead single from A Worm's Life on September 9, 1996. The lyrics of the song originated from originated from Brad Roberts' personal reflections about teeth, telling a story in which a boy likes the removal of his baby teeth via bizarre means.

The song is Crash Test Dummies' highest-peaking single in their native Canada, reaching number two on the RPM 100 Hit Tracks chart in 1996. "He Liked to Feel It" failed to chart elsewhere except on the US Billboard Adult Alternative Songs chart, peaking at number 18. A music video directed by Ken Fox and produced by David Moskowitz was made for the song, featuring a boy who pulls out his own teeth through different means. The video generated controversy due to the graphic imagery of the boy's mouth, which utilizes prosthetic teeth and gums.

Background and composition

Brad Roberts wrote "He Liked to Feel It". His brother Dan Roberts helped him produce the song, as did Michel Dorge. The song was recorded at Compass Point Studios in The Bahamas along with the rest of A Worm's Life. The lyrical theme of "He Liked to Feel It", intended as dark humour, came about when Brad Roberts began to ponder over his own teeth. He explained, "I was sitting around one day feeling my teeth, and I noticed that they were firmly imbedded in my skull [...] Teeth are part of the human body, but I thought that it was strange that they come out."

Ellen Reid provides the backup vocals and keyboards on the song while Dan Roberts plays bass and Dorge plays drums. Murray Pulver, who would join the band in 1996, provides additional guitars on the track. Roberts began to write the lyrics, creating a story about a boy who likes to remove his baby teeth through bizarre means. At the end of the song, the boy's father forcefully rips out a tooth with a pair of pliers, which the boy does not enjoy because he is not the one removing it.

Release and promotion
"He Liked to Feel It" was included as the second track on A Worm's Life, which was released on October 1, 1996; it was released as the album's lead single in both Canada and the United States. Arista Records serviced the song to adult album alternative radio on September 9, 1996, and to modern rock and rock stations on September 23. On Canada's RPM 100 Hit Tracks chart, the song debuted at number 83 on the issue dated September 16, 1996. On September 30, it jumped from number 68 to number 36, becoming that week's highest climber. The song continued to rise up the chart during the next several weeks, attaining its peak of number two on November 25, 1996. The song logged 21 weeks in the top 100. It is Crash Test Dummies' highest-peaking single on the RPM 100 Hit Tracks chart, and it was the 23rd most-successful single on the chart in 1996. "He Liked to Feel It" also appeared on RPMs Adult Contemporary and Alternative 30 weekly rankings, achieving peaks of numbers seven and 21, respectively. In the US, "He Liked to Feel It" appeared on the Adult Alternative Songs chart, where it peaked at number 18 on November 2, 1996. In the United Kingdom, a CD single and cassette single were issued on October 7, 1996, but the song did not appear on the UK Singles Chart.

The music video for the song was directed by Ken Fox and produced by David Moskowitz. Eric Barret executive produced the video for Original Films. The video features the band performing on a New York City rooftop interspersed with scenes of a boy, played by Leo Fitzpatrick, pulling his teeth out in various ways, including tying a tooth to a taxicab, tying one to a steak and throwing it to a dog on the other side of a fence, and tying a tooth to a crane. After the boy falls off the crane, a man approaches him and pulls out another tooth with pliers. Prosthetic teeth and gums were utilized to obtain the tooth effects used in the video. As a result of the graphic footage, the music video was banned from airing on Canadian television channel YTV, and all close-ups of the boy's gums had to be removed before the video could be shown on American television network MTV.

Track listings
All tracks were written by Brad Roberts.

Canadian promotional CD
 "He Liked to Feel It" (radio edit)3:38
 "He Liked to Feel It" (album version)3:55

US promotional CD
 "He Liked to Feel It" (radio edit)3:38

European CD single
 "He Liked to Feel It" (radio edit)3:38
 "He Liked to Feel It" (Omnichord version)3:55

European promotional maxi-CD
 "He Liked to Feel It" (radio edit)3:38
 "He Liked to Feel It" (album version)3:55

European maxi-CD single
 "He Liked to Feel It" (radio edit)3:38
 "He Liked to Feel It" (Omnichord version)3:55
 "Afternoons & Coffeespoons" (live at The Chance in Poughkeepsie, New York)3:52
 "Swimming in Your Ocean" (live at The Chance in Poughkeepsie, New York)3:30

Credits and personnel
Credits are lifted from the liner notes of A Worm's Life and the European maxi-single of "He Liked to Feel It".

Studio
 Recorded at Compass Point Studios (The Bahamas).

Crash Test Dummies
 Brad Robertslead vocals, guitars, writing, production
 Ellen Reidback-up vocals, keyboards
 Dan Robertsbass, production
 Mitch Dorgedrums, percussion, production, digital work

Additional musicians
 Murray Pulveradditional guitars

Recording
 Chris Andersonrecording
 Peter Robertsonrecording assistant
 Maria Micciorecording assistants
 Tom Lord-Algemixing
 Nevessa Productionmobile recording facility for live tracks

Charts

Weekly charts

Year-end charts

Release history

References

1996 singles
1996 songs
Arista Records singles
Crash Test Dummies songs
Music video controversies
RCA Records singles
Songs written by Brad Roberts